This is a list of Alabama suffragists, suffrage groups and others associated with the cause of women's suffrage in Alabama.

Groups 

 Alabama Equal Suffrage Association (AESA), formed in 1912. 
Alabama Woman Suffrage Organization (AWSO), created in 1893. 
Coal City Equal Suffrage Association.
 Equal Suffrage League of Birmingham, formed in 1911, later called the Equal Suffrage Association of Birmingham.
Huntsville Equal Suffrage Association, created in 1912.
Huntsville League for Woman Suffrage, formed in 1894.
National Junior Suffrage Corps.
 Selma Suffrage Association, created on March 29, 1910.
Selma Suffragette Association.
Tuskegee Women's Club.

Suffragists 

 Alice Baldridge (Huntsville).
Lillian Roden Bowron (Birmingham).
Virginia Tunstall Clay-Clopton.
James Drake (Huntsville).
Priscilla Holmes Drake (Huntsville).
Emera Frances Griffin (Huntsville).
Ellen Hildreth (Decatur).
Frances John Hobbs (Selma).
Ellelee Chapman Humes (Huntsville).
Bossie O'Brien Hundley (Huntsville).
Pattie Ruffner Jacobs.
Helen Keller (Tuscumbia).
Indiana Little.
Mary Parke London (Birmingham).
Adella Hunt Logan (Tuskegee).
Eugenie Marks (Mobile).
Elizabeth "Bessie" Moore (Coal City).
Mary Munson (Vinemont).
Nellie Kimball Murdock (Birmingham).
Carrie McCord Parke (Selma).
Mary Partridge (Selma).
Sally B. Powell (Montgomery).
Mary Howard Raiford (Selma).
Annie Buel Drake Robertson.
Pearl Still (Pell City).
Alberta Chapman Taylor (Huntsville).
Julia S. Tutwiler.
Margaret Murray Washington (Tuskegee).
Mary Amelia John Watson (Selma).
Hattie Hooker Wilkins (Selma).

Politicians supporting women's suffrage 

 Benjamin Craig (Selma).
Sam Will John.

Publications 

 Alabama Suffrage Bulletin, published by the Alabama Equal Suffrage Association starting in October 1915.
The Progressive Woman, created in 1913 and edited by Frances Griffin and Juliet Cook Olin.

Suffragists who campaigned in Alabama 

 Jane Addams.
Susan B. Anthony.
Belle Bennett.
Julia Oates Randall Bonelli.
Carrie Chapman Catt.
Jean Gordon.
Anna Howard Shaw.

Anti-suffragists

Groups 

 Alabama Association Opposed to Woman Suffrage, created in 1916.
Alabama Woman's Anti-Ratification League (AWARL).
 Southern Women's Anti-ratification League.

People 

 John H. Bankhead.
Marie Bankhead Owen.
Oscar W. Underwood.

See also 

 Timeline of women's suffrage in Alabama
 Women's suffrage in Alabama
 Women's suffrage in states of the United States
 Women's suffrage in the United States

References

Sources 

 

Alabama suffrage

Alabama suffragists
Activists from Alabama
History of Alabama
Suffragists